The Pink & The Lily is the second studio album by the Scottish singer Sandi Thom, released in both the United Kingdom and Ireland on 26 May 2008 by RCA Records. The album had been released on iTunes on 24 May 2008. The album is a mix of pop and folk songs – written by Thom herself, alongside other writers including her boyfriend, Jake Field, and Tom Gilbert, and produced by Jake Field and Duncan Thompson, who work under the alias of The Mighty Vibrations.

The album entered the UK Albums Chart at number 25, then dropped to 65 the following week, before dropping out of the top 75.

Singles
The album's first single, "The Devil's Beat," reached #58 in the UK Singles Chart. The second single, "Saturday Night", was released digitally on 25 August 2008, but failed to chart.

Name
The album's title is a reference to a pub in Lacey Green, Buckinghamshire, originally owned by two ex-employees of the local Hampden family, the butler Mr Pink and the chambermaid Miss Lilie. They had to flee after Miss Lilie fell pregnant and the family shunned them - their illegitimate son set up the pub and named it after his parents. Thom has said in interviews that the story inspired the title track of the album.

Track listing

Promotion
To promote the album Thom has travelled around her home country, Scotland, appearing in HMV branches in Aberdeen, Dundee, Perth and Edinburgh, performing tracks from her new album and signing records. This was followed by the Pink & Lily Tour to promote the new release which failed to sell out was enthusiastically received by those who attended.

Release details

References

2008 albums
Sandi Thom albums
RCA Records albums